The Calypso bean, pickle bean, orca bean, or yin yang bean, is a bean cultivar of the species Phaseolus vulgaris.

Characteristics

Plant
Calypso beans are a kidney bean hybrid. They grow on a bush-type bean plant that grows up to 15 inches (38 cm) tall. There will be 4 to 5 beans per pod. 70 to 90 days from seed for harvest. The beans are small, 3/8 inch (1 cm) long, but plump.

Colors of seed
Calypso beans are best known for the distinctly colored variety, with a striking contrast of black and white. The beans are half black, half white, with one or two black dots in the white area, though there is also a red and white variety.

Uses
When young, the pods can be harvested as a green bean. But when full-grown, they are used as a bean for drying.

Equivalents dry to cooked
Calypso beans double in size when cooked, and have a smooth texture: 1 cup dried beans = 2 cups cooked beans.

References

Phaseolus
Edible legumes